Sree Buddha College of Engineering, Pattoor, the first NAAC accredited self-financing engineering institution in the University of Kerala, India. Sree Buddha College of Engineering, Pattoor is established in the year 2002 by Sree Buddha Educational Society, Kollam, which is registered under the Travancore-Cochin Literary, Scientific and Charitable Societies Act, 1955. It is located at Pattoor, near Padanilam in Alappuzha district, Kerala, India. The college which began its stride with three B.Tech programs in 2002, now offers B.Tech/ M.Tech/PhD programs in six branches of Engineering and Technology.

The College is affiliated to APJ Abdul Kalam Technological University and is approved by the All India Council for Technical Education (AICTE), New Delhi. The College offers NBA Accredited B.Tech Programs and is Reaccredited by NAAC for another five years since November 2019. The College is also recognized under Section 2(f) of the UGC act, 1956.

In recent years, the college has organized many programs of national importance; Prime Minister’s Samsad Gramin Yojana (PM-SAGY), Smart India Hackathon (2019), National Conference Series on Engineering Education for Facing the Future (E2F2) since 2017, etc. The college has become a center of excellence catering to the needs of higher education sector in the State of Kerala..

References

Engineering colleges in Kerala
Universities and colleges in Alappuzha district
Educational institutions established in 2002
2002 establishments in Kerala